Christian Korcan, better known by his stage name Jack Holiday, is a Swiss DJ, record producer and songwriter, and considered a renowned figure in Swiss house music, well known for his collaborations with Swiss DJs Mike Candys and Christopher S. The three have carved up a partnership in similar fashion to the Swedish House Mafia.

Biography
Jack Holiday's big success came with "Insomnia" with Mike Candys. It became an international hit not only in France and Switzerland, but also in Denmark, Belgium, Germany and the Netherlands. The remix by Mike Candys and Jack Holiday was in the Top 10 best selling singles in France and Benelux countries in 2011.

Based on that success, Jack Holiday released other singles like "Raise Your Hands" that reached top of the French Dance Charts and "Love For You" which was featured on Fun Radio.

Discography

Singles

References

External links 
 

Living people
Swiss DJs
Swiss house musicians
Swiss dance musicians
Electronic dance music DJs
1982 births